Felsőmarác is a village in Vas County, Hungary, lying east of Ivánc.

Populated places in Vas County